China, IL (meaning China, Illinois) is an American adult animated sitcom created by Brad Neely for Cartoon Network late night programming block, Adult Swim. The series takes place at the "Worst College in America", located at the edge of town. The school's poor reputation is celebrated by the school's uncaring faculty and staff. Steve and Frank Smith (voiced by Neely) are twin professors at the college, teaching history with limited success, while Professor Leonard Cakes (voiced by Jeffrey Tambor) is the father of undergraduate Mark "Baby" Cakes (also voiced by Neely), who spends his time at college with the school staff. Pony Merks (voiced by Greta Gerwig) is the teacher's aide for the history department at the school, and the most rational of the staff, but still willing to go along with the staff's insane plots to avoid working.

The series was originally conceived as a web series on Adult Swim's defunct comedy website, Super Deluxe, in 2008. Neely, who had done Baby Cakes and The Professor Brothers shorts for Super Deluxe in 2006, envisioned the characters in each series to coexist in the same universe. With the relationship in mind, he produced a four-part internet series entitled China, IL, which was published on Super Deluxe in 2008. An 11-minute special combining the shorts, entitled "China, IL: The Funeral", aired on Adult Swim on May 25, 2008. The series officially premiered on October 2, 2011, and ended on June 14, 2015 with a total of 30 episodes.

Series Overview

Episodes

Pilots

Season 1 (2011–12)

Season 2 (2013)

Season 3 (2015)

References

China IL
China IL